Franco Emanuel Cervi (26 May 1994) is an Argentine professional footballer who plays as a winger for Spanish club Celta de Vigo and the Argentina national team.

Club career

Rosario Central
A product of Rosario Central's youth system, Cervi made his league debut on 9 November 2014 against Estudiantes in a 1–0 home win. He replaced Hernán Encina after 66 minutes. On 14 February 2015, he scored his first league goal against Racing Club.

On 25 February 2016, Cervi made his debut in the Copa Libertadores against Nacional. He scored his first international goal in a 3–1 win against River Plate.

Benfica
On 15 September 2015, Cervi signed a six-year contract with Portuguese champions Benfica with a release clause of €60 million. He continued to play for Rosario Central until May 2016 and joined Benfica on 24 June for the pre-season. On his debut for Benfica, he scored the opening goal in a 3–0 win over Braga in the Supertaça Cândido de Oliveira, on 7 August 2016, and was elected best player on pitch.

On 29 December, Cervi became the first Benfica player to score in all Portuguese competitions in the same season – Supertaça, Primeira Liga, Taça de Portugal and Taça da Liga respectively. In addition, he also scored in the UEFA Champions League.

Celta de Vigo
On 5 July 2021, Cervi joined Celta de Vigo.

International career
Cervi was selected in Argentina's 35-man provisional squad for the 2016 Summer Olympics in Rio de Janeiro, however he did not make the final 18-man squad for the tournament.

Cervi made his international debut for Argentina in a 3–0 friendly win over Guatemala on 8 September 2018.

Personal life
Cervi, who is of Italian descent, possesses an Italian passport.

Career statistics

Club

International

Scores and results list Argentina's goal tally first, score column indicates score after each Cervi goal.

Honours
Benfica
Primeira Liga: 2016–17, 2018–19
Taça de Portugal: 2016–17
Supertaça Cândido de Oliveira: 2016, 2017
Individual
2016 Supertaça Cândido de Oliveira: Best Player

References

External links

1994 births
Living people
Argentine people of Italian descent
Sportspeople from Santa Fe Province
Argentine footballers
Association football wingers
Argentina international footballers
Rosario Central footballers
Argentine Primera División players
S.L. Benfica footballers
Primeira Liga players
RC Celta de Vigo players
La Liga players
Argentine expatriate footballers
Argentine expatriate sportspeople in Portugal
Argentine expatriate sportspeople in Spain
Expatriate footballers in Portugal
Expatriate footballers in Spain